Rolando Maximiliano "Bruno" Martins Indi (born 8 February 1992) is a Dutch professional footballer who plays as a defender for Eredivisie club AZ Alkmaar and the Netherlands national team.

Martins Indi began his career with Dutch club Feyenoord, after progressing through the club's youth teams. He spent four seasons at De Kuip, making 120 appearances before moving to Portugal in July 2014 to play for Porto for a fee of €7.7 million. In August 2016 Martins Indi joined Premier League side Stoke City on loan for the 2016–17 season. A year later, he signed for Stoke permanently for a fee of £7 million. After 137 games for Stoke, he returned to the Eredivisie with AZ in 2021, initially on loan.

A full international for the Netherlands since 2012, he has gained over 30 caps and was part of their squad which finished third at the 2014 FIFA World Cup.

Early life
Born in Barreiro, Portugal, to parents from Guinea-Bissau, Martins Indi moved to Rotterdam, Netherlands, with his family, at the age of three months. He began playing football with youth teams at amateur club Spartaan '20 before joining the Feyenoord Academy at the age of 13.

Club career

Feyenoord
Martins Indi joined Feyenoord's first team squad as an academy graduate at the start of the 2010–11 season. He made his professional debut for Feyenoord on 19 August 2010, when he was part of the starting line-up in the Europa League home match against Gent (1–0). Three days later, on 22 August 2010, he also made his Eredivisie debut in the 1–1 draw against Heracles Almelo. On 12 September 2010, Martins Indi received a red card for the first time in his club career in stoppage time in a 2–0 loss against NAC Breda. On 17 April 2011, Martins Indi scored his first Eredivisie goal for Feyenoord in a 6–1 win over Willem II, He, along with Ryo Miyaichi and Georginio Wijnaldum, made headlines after the match having done a sound job defensively and having capped a promising performance with a header goal from a corner kick.

In the 2011–12 season, Martins Indi became a regular starter under Feyenoord's new manager Ronald Koeman. On 22 October 2011, Martins Indi scored his first league goal of the season in a 2–1 loss against VVV-Venlo. On 22 February 2012, Martins Indi signed a new contract that would keep him contracted at De Kuip until the summer of 2016. He played 31 times in 2011–12 as Feyenoord finished in 2nd position behind Ajax. He remained a key player under Koeman in the 2012–13 and 2013–14 campaigns, playing in 39 and 31 games respectively.

Porto
On 15 July 2014, Martins Indi transferred to Primeira Liga side Porto for €7.7 million. He scored his first goal for Porto in a 2–1 home win over Braga on 5 October 2014. Martins Indi played 37 times in the for Porto as they finished runners-up to Benfica in the league whilst they were also eliminated by Bayern Munich at the quarter-final stage of the UEFA Champions League. In 2015–16, he made 33 appearances as the side finished third and at the end of the campaign he was told by new manager Nuno Espírito Santo he was free to leave the Estádio do Dragão.

Stoke City
On 31 August 2016, Martins Indi joined Premier League side Stoke City on loan for the 2016–17 season. He made his debut for Stoke on 10 September 2016 against Tottenham Hotspur. Martins Indi formed a defensive partnership with Ryan Shawcross which helped Stoke make a recovery from a poor start to the season. On 31 December 2016 Martins Indi scored this first goal in English football in a 4–2 defeat away at Chelsea. In May 2017 Martins Indi stated that he wants to turn his loan move into a permanent transfer in the summer. However Mark Hughes admitted that a deal with Porto for Martins Indi had hit an "impasse" and at the end of the season he returned to Porto.

After lengthy negotiations between Stoke and Porto, Martins Indi eventually joined Stoke on 11 August 2017, signing a five-year contract for a fee of £7 million. Martins Indi struggled with injuries in 2017–18, making 19 appearances as Stoke suffered relegation to the EFL Championship. He remained with Stoke in the second tier in 2018–19 playing 41 times as the side finished in 16th position. He scored a rare goal in a 2–0 win against Bolton Wanderers on 2 October 2018. During the season Martins Indi was played out of position at left back by both Gary Rowett and Nathan Jones. Towards the end of the season with Stoke having failed to mount a promotion challenge, Martins Indi admitted that he was contemplating leaving as he looks for a return to the top level.

Martins Indi was linked with a move away from the club in the summer of 2019 but a transfer failed to happen and he remained with Stoke. Stoke began the season a poor form which saw Jones replaced by Michael O'Neill in November and he moved Martins Indi was again moved to left back. He kept his place in the team for the rest of the 2019–20 season, making 35 appearances helping Stoke avoid relegation and finish in 15th position.

AZ Alkmaar
On 6 October 2020 Martins Indi joined AZ Alkmaar on loan for the 2020–21 season. Martins Indi played 33 times for AZ helping them finish in 3rd place, qualifying for the UEFA Europa League. He made his move to AZ permanent on 5 July 2021.

In 2021–22, Martins Indi played 45 games in all competitions, scoring twice, as AZ came fifth. The team reached the last 16 of the UEFA Europa Conference League and beat Vitesse in a playoff to qualify for the next season's edition.

International career
Martins Indi was eligible to play for either Portugal or the Netherlands as he has a dual passport; additionally, he was also eligible for Guinea-Bissau, his parents' nationality. Martins Indi favoured the Dutch team. On 25 October 2009, Martins Indi made his debut for the Netherlands under-17 squad in a 2–1 loss to Colombia at the 2009 U-17 World Cup before coming off for Ouasim Bouy in the 79th minute. This was his only appearance for the Dutch U17 team. On 23 May 2010, Martins Indi was called up to the Netherlands under-19 squad and played the full 90 minutes in a 3–0 victory over Germany.

On 15 August 2012, he played his first full international game against Belgium. Despite the Netherlands losing 4–2, Martins Indi made an impressive debut and helped create both Dutch goals. He became a regular player during qualification for the 2014 FIFA World Cup, scoring his first international goals in 4–1 defeats of Hungary and Romania. In 2013, Martins Indi represented the Netherlands under-21 team at the UEFA Under-21 Championship. His performances saw him included in UEFA's all-star squad for the tournament.

On 13 June 2014, Martins Indi made his World Cup debut in a 5–1 victory over reigning champions Spain. On 18 June, in his second World Cup game against Australia, he was knocked unconscious by Tim Cahill and taken to hospital with a suspected concussion. He recovered faster than expected and he missed only the final group stage fixture against Chile. The Netherlands eventually finished third in the tournament.

Martins Indi was sent off after 10 minutes of an eventual 2–0 friendly defeat away to Italy on 4 September 2014 after conceding a penalty by fouling Simone Zaza and denying him a goalscoring opportunity. In a UEFA Euro 2016 qualifying match on 3 September the following year, he was again dismissed for striking Kolbeinn Sigþórsson, as the Dutch lost 1–0 at the Amsterdam Arena in Danny Blind's first game in charge.

After five years away, Martins Indi was recalled for UEFA Nations League games against Wales and Poland in June 2022.

Personal life
On 23 March 2012, Martins Indi became a father after his girlfriend Mecia gave birth to a daughter. Martins Indi is fluent in Portuguese and still speaks it with his parents. He is an observant Muslim.

Career statistics

Club

International

Scores and results list the Netherlands' goal tally first, score column indicates score after each Martins Indi goal.

Honours
Netherlands
FIFA World Cup third place: 2014

References

External links

Bruno Martins Indi at Voetbal International 

1992 births
Living people
Portuguese emigrants to the Netherlands
Naturalised citizens of the Netherlands
Portuguese people of Bissau-Guinean descent
Dutch people of Bissau-Guinean descent
Sportspeople from Barreiro, Portugal
Dutch sportspeople of African descent
Portuguese sportspeople of Bissau-Guinean descent
Dutch footballers
Portuguese footballers
Footballers from Rotterdam
Association football defenders
Netherlands international footballers
Netherlands under-21 international footballers
Netherlands youth international footballers
2014 FIFA World Cup players
Eredivisie players
Primeira Liga players
Premier League players
English Football League players
Feyenoord players
FC Porto players
Stoke City F.C. players
AZ Alkmaar players
Dutch Muslims
Portuguese Muslims
Black Portuguese sportspeople
Dutch expatriate footballers
Dutch expatriate sportspeople in England
Expatriate footballers in England